is a fictional character from the Neon Genesis Evangelion franchise created by Gainax. He is the franchise's poster boy and protagonist. In the anime series of the same name, Shinji is a young man abandoned by his father Gendo. Gendo asks him to pilot a mecha called Evangelion Unit 01 to protect the city of Tokyo-3 from creatures which threaten to destroy humanity named Angels. Shinji appears in the franchise's animated feature films and related media, video games, the manga Petit Eva: Evangelion@School, the Rebuild of Evangelion films, and the manga adaptation by Yoshiyuki Sadamoto.

Director Hideaki Anno conceived Shinji as a representation of himself, reflecting his four-year depression after the airing of his previous work, Nadia: The Secret of Blue Water. Shinji's insecurity and torment are explored through streams of consciousness and inner monologues, with episodes focusing on his introspection. Anno used psychoanalytical theories for his characterization, including the Freudian psychosexual development model. His design was created by Sadamoto. Shinji is voiced by Megumi Ogata in Japanese, and by Spike Spencer and Casey Mongillo in English.

The character has had a mixed response from anime and manga publications. Although his complexity was praised and generally considered realistic, he was criticized for his insecurity and weakness. Shinji's characterization in the spin-offs and the Rebuild of Evangelion films, however, received more positive comments for his more courageous and self-confident personality, especially in the second instalment of the saga, Evangelion: 2.0 You Can (Not) Advance. Shinji has placed highly in popularity polls and has been the subject of scholarly study. Merchandise based on the character, including action figures and perfumes, has been marketed.

Conception

Design 

Neon Genesis Evangelion character designer Yoshiyuki Sadamoto drew Shinji in an ordinary summer school uniform with a white shirt, making him "an average character". He wanted a "realistic and ordinary" boy, a character "that'll be hard for others to make". Since Shinji lacks the enthusiasm and courage of other robot-anime heroes, Sadamoto gave him a different interpretation of the concept of heroism: "Rather than a reflection of a hero, sort of a refraction of a hero". At first, he tried to create a character "that would tap into the consciousness of today's anime fans".

In one of Sadamoto's original proposals he had long hair, which would have covered his face or fluttered in the wind during the dramatic scenes. Sadamoto changed his mind, finding his original design "too wild". He tried for a look where one could see the forehead through the bangs, "the look of a boyish young girl", giving him girl's eyes. He thus modelled the character on Nadia Arwol from The Secret of Blue Water; his face was designed almost identical to the face of Nadia, with just a change in hairstyle.

Development

Neon Genesis Evangelion director Hideaki Anno was depressed for four years before the series production. After the failure of the Royal Space Force: The Wings of Honnêamise sequel Aoki Uru, Gainax began planning a new series. According to Gainax co-founder Yasuhiro Takeda, ideas from Aoki Uru were borrowed for the new project, including the concept of "not running away"; for Takeda, the passage was "something more than just transposing one show's theme onto another... Anno inherited something from Aoki Uru — the determination not to run away from problems — and what we saw in Evangelion was maybe just a reflection of those feelings". Anno chose "It's ok to run away" as the main theme for the series, with the idea that "it's perfectly fine" to run away sometimes and that "There are things that you gain and things that you lose running away, after all".

He reflected his depression in the series, conceiving a world "drenched in a vision of pessimism"; he also began production "with the wish that once the production complete, the world and the heroes would change". He originally proposed a character similar to Asuka Langley Soryu as the protagonist, following the Gainax tradition of a female protagonist in Gunbuster and The Secret of Blue Water. Sadamoto objected to a new female protagonist, saying that "a robot should be piloted by a trained person, and if that person just happens to be a girl then that is fine"; however, he did not understand why a young girl "would pilot a robot". He eventually suggested a boy as the main character; his relationship with Asuka, who became another primary character, was modelled after Nadia's relationship with Jean, her love interest and eventual husband in the series.

Accepting Sadamoto's proposals, Anno suggested a male protagonist after Ryū Murakami's works with two fellow female pilots by his side. He also gave Shinji two male friends, Tōji Suzuhara and Kensuke Aida, whose names were borrowed from Murakami's novel Ai to gensō no fascism. Anno named the new male character after two of his friends, including Neon Genesis Evangelion animator Shinji Higuchi. For the last name, he chose the Japanese word Ikari ("anchor"), borrowing the names of other characters in the series from nautical jargon or Japanese Imperial Navy warships. 

According to Hiroki Satō, head of the public relations office at Gainax, the staff decided that the series would focus on "how Shinji deals with things going on inside himself". Anno fixed the protagonist at "age fourteen", when "independence of mind starts manifesting". Shinji's character was conceived to reflect Anno's personality "both in conscious and unconscious part". He was thus represented as "a melancholic oral-dependent type" caught "in [an] oral stage", as Anno considered himself. Seeing Shinji as a reflection of Anno, assistant director Kazuya Tsurumaki avoided depicting him as a brave character, since "Anno isn't that much of a hero". "Shinji was summoned by his father to ride a robot, Anno was summoned by Gainax to direct an animation", he said. Like other male protagonists in Gainax series, Shinji was conceived with a weak and insecure personality. Gainax wanted to reflect the psychological state of animation fans and the Japanese society, in which fathers are always at work and emotionally absent. Shinji was first conceived with slightly different features, which were changed by the main staff. In the original project, he was more mature, robust, and less introverted than in the final version; he should also have been portrayed as a studious boy, a "quiet A-student". His scholastic conduct would not be seen in a positive light, but as a sign of passivity. According to Michael House, Gainax former member and translator, Anno also tried to find a way to end the series with a smiling Shinji, but he realized in the process that "the characters he'd created weren't capable of whatever positive change" and reach the result that he had initially imagined, adjusting his original plans.

Voice 

In the original Japanese, Shinji is voiced by Megumi Ogata in all his appearances in the original series, as well as the later films, spin-offs, video games, and the Rebuild of Evangelion film series. Ogata's agent initially refused her participation in Evangelion, and she agreed due to her status as a newcomer, but Anno directly insisted with her. She also described Shinji as one of the "most memorable" roles of her career. His characterization required considerable physical and psychological effort. In the eighteenth episode, for example, Shinji cries and gasps during a fight; Ogata felt like her "whole body [was] aching". "Every time a new script arrived, every time I turned a new page I was torn apart by a new pain", she said. Dubbing the film The End of Evangelion (1997), moreover, she tried to achieve "a higher synchronization rate with the general director than the TV series".

The Rebuild of Evangelion dub also presented obstacles. On the last recording day for the film Evangelion: 2.0 You Can (Not) Advance (2009), Ogata was forced to scream; she collapsed on the studio floor, and Anno sat on the floor with her. He praised her work and shook her hand, thanking her for "keeping the character's feelings unchanged" and for adding her thirteen years of experience "to the current Shinji".

In the following film, Evangelion: 3.0 You Can (Not) Redo (2012), in which Shinji is treated coldly by the rest of the cast, Ogata stated that she felt like him and experienced emotional pain. The voice actress first saw the scene in which Kaworu Nagisa reveals to Shinji the conditions of planet Earth in her home, when it was not yet animated. The recordings took place in March 2012, and she associated the destroyed landscape of the film with images of the 2011 Tōhoku earthquake and tsunami imagining that the catastrophe was her fault. During the pre-score the drawings for Kaworu's death scene were not clear in the animatic, and the staff animated the keyframes during the recording touch-ups. Ogata was shocked when she performed the scene and stated that her interpretation could reflect her emotional state, resulting "kind of traumatic".

For the final installment, Evangelion: 3.0+1.0 Thrice Upon a Time (2021), Ogata was involved more heavily in the plot's development. Anno felt he could no longer understand Shinji and his current self was closer to Gendo, so he needed Ogata's input. He also felt that the only people who could understand Shinji's feelings were Ogata herself and his assistant, Ikki Todoroki. Ogata also recounted Anno had asked her what sort of ending she'd prefer "as Shinji". His adult self in the film is voiced by Ryūnosuke Kamiki, while Spike Spencer and Casey Mongillo voiced him in the ADV and Netflix English dub, respectively.

Appearances

Neon Genesis Evangelion 
Shinji is the only child of Gendo Rokubungi and Yui Ikari, a student at Kyoto University who became a researcher. When he was three years old, Yui brought Shinji to the Gehirn research center in Hakone to see Evangelion 01's first activation test. In an accident, his mother disappears before his eyes; after the accident, Gendo leaves Shinji with an acquaintance for about ten years. After becoming commander of the Nerv special agency, he invites Shinji to the city of Tokyo-3 to pilot Evangelion Unit-01 to protect the city from creatures known as Angels. Shinji reluctantly agrees, and fights against the Angel Sachiel. After the Angel attack, Shinji starts to live with Misato Katsuragi, a Nerv officer and his new guardian, and attends school in Tokyo-3; after his arrival he gradually changes and meets Toji Suzuhara and Kensuke Aida, with whom he befriends. When the Angel Ramiel tries to destroy Nerv headquarters, Shinji and fellow pilot Rei Ayanami work together to destroy him. After Ramiel's defeat, a nuclear-powered machine intended to fight the Angels called Jet Alone runs amok, and he and Misato stop it; during this time, Shinji gradually starts to change his attitude, trying to be more open and spontaneous. He also meets Asuka Langley Soryu, an Eva pilot from Germany, and they defeat the Angel Gaghiel together in the eighth episode.

In the second third of the series, Shinji, Rei and Asuka face Angels in quicker succession and Shinji begins bonding with his peers, especially Asuka, becoming more confident and assertive. When they are sent to fight the Angel Leliel, Shinji, receiving praise from Gendo and improving his synchronization scores, accepts his role as an Evangelion pilot. He decides to attack on his own, but is sucked into a parallel universe by Leliel called Dirac Sea. In the Dirac Sea, Shinji confronts the Angel and his inner self; he is freed from the Angel by Yui, whose soul is in the Eva.

After Shinji is forced to fight Eva-03, controlled by the Angel Bardiel, with classmate Toji Suzahara trapped inside, he decides to quit Nerv. Meanwhile, Angel Zeruel mutilates the other Evangelion units, defeating Rei and Asuka. After talking with his mentor and Misato's lover, Ryoji Kaji, Shinji returns to Nerv to protect the city. He merges with its unit and frees the Evangelion; however, he is trapped in its core for a month. Although Rei sacrifices herself in the battle against the Angel Armisael to save Shinji, she is revived through one of her clones. Asuka runs away and falls into a coma; Toji and Kensuke flee Tokyo-3, and Shinji becomes depressed. In the twenty-fourth episode, he meets Kaworu Nagisa, Asuka's substitute pilot, and they become close. Kaworu turns out to be the final Angel, and Shinji is forced to kill him. After Kaworu's death, during a process named Instrumentality, in which the souls of the entire humanity unite in a single collective consciousness, he confronts his traumas and why he acts the way he does. After talking with most of the Evangelion cast and seeing a version of himself in a world where he leads a normal life, Shinji becomes aware of his own potential and realizes the importance of his thoughts, and he is congratulated by the rest of the cast.

The End of Evangelion 
The 1997 film The End of Evangelion continues Shinji's story, portraying his downward spiral into depression and loss of the will to live. Shinji visits a comatose Asuka in the hospital; when his pleas for attention go unanswered, he exposes Asuka's breasts and masturbates. He remains catatonic while all Nerv personnel, including Misato, are killed during an attack. Shinji then decides to pilot the Eva to save those who are still alive, while Asuka is on the surface fighting the Mass Production Evas. He is, however, unable to reach her in time, and when Shinji learns about Asuka's defeat, the Evangelion moves on its own to let him reenter it. After seeing the mutilated corpse of Asuka's Unit-02, Shinji's intense emotion summons a spear named Lance of Longinus to Earth and the Eva becomes a tree of life.

Shinji then has long dreamlike exchanges with Misato, Rei and Asuka about the pain of reality and his tensions with them. When he begs for Asuka's attention and she refuses him, arguing he only wants to use her as a crutch, Shinji begins Instrumentality and humanity's souls are reunited into one existence. After re-evaluating his position, he decides that he wants to live in a world where other people exist and returns to Earth, allowing other humans to return. Shinji, having placed grave markers in memory of most of the other characters, wakes up some time later with Asuka lying next to him. He suddenly tries to strangle her, but stops and breaks down when Asuka regains consciousness and caresses his face.

Rebuild of Evangelion 

In Rebuild of Evangelion, Shinji returns as the central protagonist; in Evangelion: 1.0 You Are (Not) Alone (2007), the first instalment of the saga, Shinji's role is similar to that of the anime series. He is assigned to be the pilot of Unit-01, and works with Rei to defeat the Angel Ramiel. In the second instalment, Evangelion: 2.0 You Can (Not) Advance (2009), Shinji reluctantly continues his duties as the pilot of Unit-01. After the battle with Angel Bardiel, when his father forced his Unit-01 to critically injure Asuka, Shinji retires from his duties and leaves Nerv. When Angel Zeruel consumes Rei, Shinji returns and defeats the Angel; his decisions, however, trigger a catastrophic event named Third Impact. Through this, Shinji apparently saves Rei by fusing with the Evangelion.

In the third film, Evangelion: 3.0 You Can (Not) Redo (2012), set fourteen years later, Shinji awakens to a world completely changed by the Third Impact and is treated with hostility by Misato and others. They place an explosive device named DSS Choker on his neck, ready to be activated if he comes close to starting another Impact. After learning from Misato that they are part of Wille, a new organization fighting Nerv, Shinji leaves when Rei appears. At the remnants of Nerv, he is approached by Kaworu Nagisa, an Eva-13 designed pilot who befriends him. He becomes despondent after Kaworu tells him that humanity holds him responsible for initiating the Third Impact. After Shinji realizes that he failed to save Rei and the new Rei is a clone, Nagisa convinces him to pilot Eva-13 with him. Confronting Asuka and Mari, Shinji begins a Fourth Impact; Eva-13 eats the twelfth Angel, and ascends to divinity. Kaworu is killed by the DSS Choker he took from Shinji to stop the Fourth Impact. Devastated, Shinji loses his will to live. Asuka rescues him from his Entry Plug, berating him for acting "like a baby". The Rei clone appears and follows them, as they head along the ruins of Tokyo-3 to again be rescued by Wille.

In Evangelion: 3.0+1.0 Thrice Upon a Time (2021), the last installment of the saga, Shinji, still distraught over Kaworu's death, wanders without a will to live with Asuka and Rei. With the two companions, he reaches a protected citadel inhabited by survivors of the various Impacts and isolated from the outside world, the Village-3. Here Shinji meets his old classmates Toji, Kensuke, and Hikari Horaki, and, with the help of Asuka and Rei, he gradually regains the will to live. He then decides to leave with Asuka and the other members from the Wille for Antarctica, where Shinji on board the Eva-01 faces his father Gendo and his Eva-13. Not being able to defeat him with brute force, the boy decides to talk to him; at the end of the process, Gendo apologizes to Shinji and embraces him. Shinji finds himself in a reborn world, and on a beach he meets Mari Illustrious Makinami, saying goodbye to all the Evangelions. Shortly after, a visibly grown Shinji can be seen in a station; Mari comes to meet him, and the two of them walk together into a new world, holding hands.

Manga 
In Yoshiyuki Sadamoto's Neon Genesis Evangelion manga adaptation, Shinji's characterization differs. Sadamoto tried to portray him as more of a misfit, a young teenager more stubborn, rebellious, juvenile and apathetic than Hideaki Anno's insecure character. In the anime's fourth episode, "Hedgehog's Dilemma", Shinji runs away from home because he is overwhelmed by responsibility; in the manga, he runs away because he realizes that Misato is spying on him and documenting his every move. After the battle against Bardiel, in which his friend Toji dies following an order from Commander Ikari, Shinji tries to punch his father. He has a close relationship with Rei in the manga and Kaji is more of a mentor to him. Shinji's relationship with Kaworu is difficult; he accuses Kaworu of being cynical and strange. Shinji's backstory is modified, with the introduction of an unnamed aunt, uncle and cousins and memories of his childhood away from Gendo. A different Instrumentality is shown, with Shinji saving Asuka during her fight against the Mass Production Evangelions. At the end, he is seen leading a normal life in a reformed world; he sees Asuka while waiting for a train, although they only have a faint recollection of one another.

Sadamoto decided to work on an Evangelion manga when he saw Shinji in the first episodes of the original series. He wondered "what the world looked like through Shinji's eyes". While in the anime Shinji's motto is "I must not run away", Sadamoto chose "being honest with themselves" as the main theme for the manga. This led Sadamoto to change Shinji's characterization and psychology. He wanted to reflect contemporary teenagers in the character and was influenced by the Gulf War, wondering how a 14-year-old would have behaved on a helicopter. Sadamoto also drew on his own experiences as an adolescent, saying that his characterization was "more like a flunk-out" than Anno's version. He conceived Shinji with a "clean image that a woman tends to project" in his mind, portraying him as a "cold, unambitious" character, "the type who would commit suicide, but can't bring himself to do it" and trying to design a character from the more stoic part of himself. "It was my intention to create a wistful character who had given up on life", he said. According to Anno's thought process, a twisted person puts on a "cool face" hiding the crazy portion, while Sadamoto perceived his approach as the opposite; Sadamoto described his characters as stoic and earnest but with a twisted outside, "just like a child". He also described his Shinji as a character that refuses to listen but "still makes the right decision".

In other media 
In a scene from the last episode of the animated series, an alternate universe is presented with a different story from the previous episodes; in this parallel reality, Shinji lives with both his parents and is a normal middle-school student. He is also a protagonist in Shinji Ikari Raising Project and Neon Genesis Evangelion: Angelic Days, where he is portrayed as happier and more stable than his anime counterpart. The same characterization is found in Neon Genesis Evangelion: Girlfriend of Steel 2nd. Some spin-offs and video games have the option of pairing Shinji romantically with Asuka Langley Soryu, Rei Ayanami, Kaworu and other characters, including his classmate Hikari Horaki and original characters such as Mana Kirishima, an extrovert transfer student firstly introduced in the Neon Genesis Evangelion: Girlfriend of Steel videogame, and Mayumi Yamagishi, an introverted girl presented in the Neon Genesis Evangelion: 2nd Impression videogame. In Neon Genesis Evangelion: Shinji Ikari Raising Project, he is presented as a childhood friend of Asuka and a distant cousin of Rei Ayanami. In Petit Eva: Evangelion@School, Shinji is portrayed as a boy "frightened by the idea of growing up" but popular with the students of Tokyo-3's Municipal Nerv High School. In Evangelion: Detective Shinji Ikari, Kaji and Kaworu are portrayed as private investigators whom Shinji asks for help and investigates a mysterious case.

In Neon Genesis Evangelion: Anima, set three years after The End of Evangelion with a different Instrumentality scenario, Shinji is 17 years old; he lets his hair grow and is a good friend of Rei and Asuka. He first pilots the Evangelion Unit-01 Type-F and, after the attack of Eva0.0 (Quatre) and the unification of his soul with Eva-01, pilots the mecha Super Evangelion and its upgrades. In addition to video games based on the original animated series, Shinji appears in media outside the Evangelion franchise, such as Monster Strike, Tales of Zestiria, Puzzle & Dragons, and a crossover episode of Shinkansen Henkei Robo Shinkalion, in which he is voiced by Ogata and pilots a 500 Type Eva transformable train. For Shinkalion, Ogata voiced him as a more "level-headed" character. He is a playable character in the Super Robot Wars crossover video-game franchise, where he and other Evangelion characters work with characters from other mecha series. Shinji has crushes on other characters, such as Lynn Minmay, sparking jealousy in Asuka, who tries to recapture his attention. In other games, Eva Unit-01 goes berserk after fighting the fourth Angel and he fights Kouji Kabuto and Mazinger Z. He later rejoins the battle against the Angels with Rei Ayanami.

Characterization and themes 
Shinji is a dependent and introverted boy with few friends, reluctant and unable to communicate with other people. Due to this, Shinji is also frightened by contact with strangers. He tends to be apologetic and passive in his relationships. He also avoids choosing his clothes, wearing clothes provided by others. Unlike a stereotypical hero, particularly of the mecha genre, Shinji is more apathetic and reluctant than courageous. According to his voice actress, Megumi Ogata, "he didn't act like an anime character, but typically talked very quietly and sparingly, and it was like he was suddenly thrust into an anime world".  Character designer Sadamoto conceived him as "the kind of character who would encase himself in a shell of his own making". Director Hideaki Anno similarly described him as a "cowardly young man" who has convinced himself that "he is a completely unnecessary person" after his father Gendo abandoned him. His childhood trauma leads him to doubt the value of his existence, to be disheartened, and to seek a raison d'être; he also wonders about why he pilots Eva-01 in the latter part of the series. The last two episodes also focus on Shinji's path and psyche; in a stream of consciousness, he admits being afraid of himself and of his father. Despite the tension between him and his father, however, Shinji yearns to trust him.

According to writer Gerald Alva Miller, Shinji craves acceptance and is concerned about how others perceive him, but "he also remains incapable of accepting love from others". He also pilots Eva-01 for the approval of others, particularly Gendo, rather than out of heroism or idealism. Despite this, assistant director Kazuya Tsurumaki noted that Shinji acts in opposition to the conventional impression of him: "He is not cowardly and indecisive; he is obstinate and doesn't pay any mind to other people." Anno described him as "both an introvert and righteous" boy who tends to categorize things, the kind of character who tends to hide something, "like a way to escape from that closure". Furthermore, according to Sadamoto, he is not as dark as perceived by fans; with the exception of The End of Evangelion, in which he is portrayed as "pretty dark and introspective", he stated that he never got the impression of a dark character in the original series. According to Ogata, at the end of the film Shinji grows up, naturally closing his path from childhood to adulthood.

Writer Paul M. Malone compared him to the German jurist and writer Daniel Paul Schreber, noting "a surprising degree of intertextuality" with his Memoirs of My Nervous Illness, although he did not consider Evangelion to be based directly on his Memoirs. Malone, following Japanese critic and writer Kotani Mari, described Shinji as an effeminate and androgynous character. According to Mari, Shinji becomes effeminate in the course of the story, and she described him as a "female savior". He has also been described as a tragic hero and likened to Oedipus. Writer and animation critic Patrick Drazen similarly compared the dilemma faced by Shinji in the twenty-fourth episode against the Angel Tabris to Hamlet, the protagonist of Shakespeare's tragedy of the same name.

For the Japanese sociologist Tsutomu Hashimoto, Shinji could be seen as an heir of the Japanese society of the seventies and eighties, engaged in the search for freedom from social constraints and the figures of authoritarian family fathers; the sociologist cited the musician Yutaka Ozaki as a symbol of this search for freedom, since he tried to escape from the impositions of the school system and he eventually "returned" to the mother figure. Hashimoto compared Shinji's final choice, in which he rejects the Instrumentality Project desired by the authoritarian father Gendo, to the concept of liberalism, which prescribes respect for any individual identity. Other critics associated the character with the youth and climate of 1990s Japan, shaken by the Tokyo subway sarin attack operated by the Japanese sect Aum Shinrikyō, the Great Hanshin earthquake, and the bursting of the Japanese asset price bubble.

After his arrival on Tokyo-3, Shinji repeats "I mustn't run away" in an attempt to face his responsibilities, and the sentence becomes a typical mantra of the character. In the twentieth episode he remembers escaping from the experimental site where his mother died, an event that generated in him the idea of "not running away", which an official pamphlet describes as "compulsive". Hiroki Azuma, a Japanese philosopher and cultural critic, speaking of his motto "I mustn't run away", described Evangelion as a story that depicts "anxiety without a cause", linking this feeling to the repercussions after the Aum Shinrikyō attack. Azuma also described Shinji and other characters in the series as "stereotypical characters" through which Anno succeeded to describe the nineties. Psychiatrist Kōji Mizobe indicated him as a dependent boy unable to communicate but also argued that the fundamental characteristic of Shinji is sociability, describing him as a "sympathetic person" who accepts and imitates others. Mizobe interpreted his synchronization with Asuka's movements on the ninth episode as proof of this ability. He also interpreted Evangelion as a story in which the main characters try to build their stable identity, saying that Shinji and Asuka's communication problems are the reason why even years after the first airing younger Japanese viewers identify themselves with the characters. 

Critics interpreted Shinji as an alter ego of the series director, Hideaki Anno, and as an otaku. IGN's Ramsey Isler interpreted his feelings as a reflection of his mood; according to him, Anno "went through a serious bout of depression while making the show and like a true artist he poured all of that emotion and despair into his work". Isler also interpreted his characterization and his battles against the Angels as a metaphor for Anno's attempts "to defeat his own personal demons". Assistant director Tsurumaki gave a similar interpretation, working on the series with the idea that Shinji's emotions are a reflection of Anno's feelings: "That's why in the scenario planning sessions I was always saying something like, 'Isn't that a little too hero-like for Shinji to say? Hideaki Anno isn't that much of a hero'". Tsurumaki also thought that Shinji could only be understood by "Japanese fans of this generation".

Critics analyzed the conflictual relationship between him and his father, comparing him with the protagonists of the works by director Yoshiyuki Tomino, especially to Amuro Ray, the main character in Mobile Suit Gundam. Artist Takashi Murakami interpreted Shinji's interior drama as "the endpoint of the postwar lineage of otaku favorites", such as Godzilla, the series of the Ultra franchise, Space Battleship Yamato or Gundam, in which hero-figures increasingly question and agonize over their missions to defend Earth and humanity. According to Toshio Okada, former president of Gainax and an acquaintance of Hideaki Anno, Evangelion and Gundam are completely different; for Okada, one thrust of the story of Gundam is "the main character's desire to be recognized by others", since in mecha anime the characters generally try to change the world, while Evangelion "complicated the whole thing, raising issues", since no one can save the world. According to Italian researcher Fabio Bartoli, Shinji is a "perfect representative" of the otaku generation. He described him as "a young man with relationship difficulties, accustomed to spending a lot of time at home". Writer Andrea Fontana agreed, seeing him as a representation of otaku and their inability to relate to others. Fontana also saw in Shinji's character "an exhortation" by Anno to otaku, Japanese society, and young people "to break the crystal cage in which they locked themselves up, looking confidently at their neighbor".

Psychoanalysis 

Shinji's personality traits have been linked to psychiatric conditions, such as depressive disorder, anxiety, social phobia, avoidant and borderline personality. Walter Veit of Psychology Today linked his passive attitude in the first episodes to Jean-Paul Sartre's existentialist concept of bad faith and Albert Camus's "philosophical suicide". Gualtiero Cannarsi, editor of the Italian adaptation of the series, noticed that Shinji struggles to make friends and has a cold, reserved attitude in the third episode, "A Transfer". Like the porcupines of Arthur Schopenhauer's Parerga and Paralipomena, Shinji is afraid to be hurt and withdraws from human contact; he suffers, in fact, for the porcupine's dilemma.

Shinji's relationship with Misato Katsuragi follows Schopenhauer's concept; Cannarsi also noticed that in the fourth episode, "Hedgehog's Dilemma", the characters get closer without hurting each other. Schopenhauer originally named his concept after the porcupine, or Hystricidae (Stachelschweine in German), but staff chose an alternative translation for the title of the installment, since they wanted to portray Shinji as a hedgehog, an animal with smaller, blunter spines than a porcupine, suggesting more delicacy for the character.

Critics noticed that, since he lost his mother traumatically, Shinji seeks a substitute in the women around him and in Eva-01, which contains her soul. Academic Susan J. Napier also interpreted the Angels as "father figures, whom Shinji must annihilate". Anime News Network reviewer Mike Crandol noticed that Shinji depends on Unit 01 in the first part of the series, becoming negatively affected by the symbiotic relationship. Crandol described his entry into Eva-01 as a Freudian "return to the womb" and his struggle to be free of the Eva as his "rite of passage" into manhood. Anno also described Shinji as a boy with a strong Oedipus complex for his father, Gendo. The Oedipal triangle is completed by their common interest in Rei Ayanami, a genetic clone of Yui Ikari. According to him, Shinji symbolically "kills" his father "and steals his mother from him".

Yūichirō Oguro, the editor of supplemental materials included in the Japanese edition of the series, interpreted Neon Genesis Evangelion's plot as an Oedipal story. Eva-01 can be seen as a motherly breast and a source of ambivalence for the character. To manage this ambivalence, Shinji "split the breast" into a good and a bad breast. Oguro described berserk Unit 01 as a "bad breast"; on the other part, he interpreted Yui as a "good breast" that eventually saves Shinji during the battles with the Angels.

In the twentieth episode, "Weaving a story 2: Oral Stage", Shinji is trapped in Eva-01, dissolving into its cockpit; in a stream of consciousness, he has visions linked with the Freudian oral stage, which include breastfeeding by Yui. With his mother's help, Shinji is symbolically reborn, finding the will to live and regaining his body. He also displays features linked with oralism, a personality of dependent, weak individuals who see other people as tools to satisfy them. According to Freudian theory, oral personalities were not adequately fed during weaning. For Oguro, Shinji resolves his oral fixation with the vision of his mother's breast, becoming a more self-conscious individual. In the last two episodes, he also sees the good and bad sides of other people; Anno himself compared him to a child and his ambivalent relationship with the mother during the oral stage. Shinji's Oedipus complex then resolves in the final episode, which ends with the captions "To my father, thank you" and "To my mother, goodbye", indicating his entry into adulthood. In the film The End of Evangelion, he also chooses to live with other human beings, rejecting Human Instrumentality and accepting other people.

Cultural impact

Popularity 
Shinji's character has been popular in Japan. The character's appreciation was also reflected in popularity polls, even years after the anime's first airing. After the series' first run, Shinji ranked second among "most popular male characters of the moment" in an Animage magazine Grand Prix poll. In the following two years' rankings, he rose to first place. In the 1997 Anime Grand Prix, Shinji received about 1,200 votes, more than double those of the second character. Megumi Ogata finished second in the voice-actor rankings for three years. Shinji also appeared in the magazine's monthly surveys, remaining in the top 20 in 1996, 1997 and 1998. In 1998, Animage ranked him 21st among the 100 most popular anime characters and 55th in 1999.

In 1998, Shinji emerged in first place among the best "dark characters" in a survey by Animedia magazine, and the magazine itself praised its complexity. For several years he also appeared in the periodical's annual popularity rankings, usually among the top ten. He placed 77th in a 2002 TV Asahi poll ranking the most popular anime characters of all time, and 25th in a 2007 list of most popular male heroes. Shinji also topped Newtype magazine's popularity charts, finishing third and first in August and September 2009. He finished third in October, becoming the most popular Evangelion male character on the list. In March 2010, Newtype cited him the "most popular male character of the nineties". In 2014, foreigners living in Japan were asked: "Which character do you aspire to look like?". Amid a wide variety of answers, Shinji finished seventh. In 2012, Fuji TV asked about 14,000 fans to name the "best anime hero", and Shinji finished twentieth. In 2016, he finished thirteenth in an Anime News Network poll of the "strongest pilots" in Japanese animation. In April 2021, after the release of the final Rebuild film, he finished second most popular male character in a Newtype poll, placing at fifth place in May, and first place in June.

Critical reaction 

The character evoked mixed opinions, dividing anime critics. Some criticized Shinji's insecurities, his vulnerability, and his lack of temper and resoluteness. Pete Harcoff, a reviewer for the Anime Critic website, praised Neon Genesis Evangelion but criticized Shinji as ineffective and disappointing to watch. THEM Anime Reviews noticed the character's constant angst in the television series as a negative trait. Raphael See found Evangelion "a little cliche, or just plain irritating at times" and criticized Shinji's pessimism. Japanator listed him among "characters with no chance in reality", saying that "he really sucks as an Eva pilot and he has the spine of a jellyfish". Comic Book Resources also criticized Shinji as a stereotypical talented male protagonist with a harem.

Other critics praised the character's realism. For Anime News Network's Nick Creamer, "every element of Shinji's emotional journey is conveyed with clear sympathy and brutal specificity". According to Susan J. Napier, Shinji "still wins the championship for most psychologically complex (or just plain neurotic) male character ever created". Critics also described him as one of the most relatable male anime characters. IGN editor Chris Mackenzie ranked him the twenty-fifth best anime character of all time. Anime Invasion magazine Jen Contino similarly praised Shinji's characterization and rated him the ninth-best anime character of all time.

In 2013, Anime News Network editor Lynzee Lam ranked him in the first place of seven "crybaby heroes" in Japanese animation, but praised his motivation and psychological realism. IGNs Ramsey Isler called him the "greatest anime character" of all time, praising his originality and realistic characterization. Isler concluded, "He's a character that challenges the audience by not giving them a superficial, vicarious power fantasy like you'd get from so many other anime. He is pathetic, but that is what makes him great. That is what makes him a genuine work of art".

Shinji's role in the Rebuild of Evangelion films was better received, with reviewers praising its more open character. Martin Theron of Anime News Network, reviewing Evangelion 1.0: You Are (Not) Alone, praised Shinji's realism. Theron called the scene in Evangelion: 2.22 You Can (Not) Advance where Shinji saves Rei the "Best Scene" in the website's "Best (and Most Notable) of 2011": "This is the first time in the entire franchise that he whole-heartedly goes after something because he wants it, rather than because he's expected to or has no choice." Examining the differences between Evangelion: 2.0 film and the original animated series, Jitendar Canth posted on myReviewer.com: "To the relief of many, Shinji isn't as much of a whiner any more, and he shows that he has a backbone on more than one occasion in this film". Despite criticizing the third film, a number of reviewers praised Shinji's interactions with Kaworu. Nicoletta Christina Browne of THEM Anime Reviews criticized their relationship, finding it "rushed", artificial and unclear. Comic Book Resources writer Daniel Kurland also praised his role in the final installment, Evangelion: 3.0+1.0 Thrice Upon a Time, writing: "Shinji deserves happiness, and it makes Thrice Upon A Time the more powerful conclusion that it finally allows Shinji to reach this point and not leave him in existential dread".

Legacy 

Shinji-themed merchandise has been released, including clothing, action figures, collectible models, perfumes, and drinks. The character has been used for Japan Racing Association advertising campaigns and for a culinary company specializing in miso soups; "Shijimi from Lake Shinji" campaign also proved successful. Movic has also released a cassette drama featuring him as part of its Animate series featuring other popular works.

With Shinji Ikari, according to Comic Book Resources, Neon Genesis Evangelion had a significant influence on Japanese animation, showing a more realistic, insecure and fragile protagonist than other past mecha series. Guilty Crown staff member Ryo Ōyama compared Shū Ōma, the series' main character, to Shinji, since: "They're both in their own world, and they don't come out from that world". According to Ōyama, Shū is "a 2011 version of Shinji", but Shinji has a "more passive", pessimistic attitude. Asa Butterfield similarly compared Shinji to Ender Wiggin in Ender's Game, whom he played. According to Butterfield, both characters "withdraw from the world", face new experiences and fight against unknown enemies. His Japanese voice actress Ogata likened Makoto Naegi from the Danganronpa franchise, which she played, to Shinji, because they're both ordinary boys "put in terrible situations".

Lain Iwakura from Serial Experiments Lain, Simon from Gurren Lagann, Daisuke Dojima from Revisions, Kōji Aiba from Infinite Ryvius, Cloud Strife from Final Fantasy VII and the main character of Cyborg She were also compared with him by anime critics. In the fourth episode of the dorama Nigeru wa Haji da ga Yaku ni Tatsu, a character named Shinji after him appears. Shinji is also referenced by Steven Universe in the show of the same name,  which parodies the series' final scene. The British group Fightstar included a track named "Shinji Ikari" on the deluxe-edition bonus disc of their album, One Day Son, This Will All Be Yours, while Open Mike Eagle named a song from his album Anime, Trauma and Divorce "Headass (Idiot Shinji)". Kong: Skull Island director Jordan Vogt-Roberts also named the character Gunpei Ikari after him.

References 
  Text was copied/adapted from Shinji Ikari at Evageeks wiki, which is released under a Creative Commons Attribution-Share Alike 3.0 (Unported) (CC-BY-SA 3.0) license.

Bibliography

External links 

 

Television characters introduced in 1995
Animated characters introduced in 1995
Child characters in animated television series
Fictional cellists
Fictional child soldiers
Fictional Japanese people in anime and manga
Fictional private military members
Male characters in anime and manga
Neon Genesis Evangelion characters
Science fiction film characters
Male characters in film
Teenage characters in television
Teenage characters in anime and manga